William Leete Stone (20 April 1792 New Paltz, New York (or 1793 Esopus, New York)  – 15 August 1844 Saratoga Springs, New York), known as Colonel Stone, was an influential journalist, publisher, author, and public official in New York City.  His name also appears as "Leet".

Biography
His father, William, was a soldier of the Revolution and afterward a Presbyterian clergyman, who was a descendant of colonial Connecticut Governor William Leete. His mother was Tamsin Graves. The son moved to Sodus, New York, in 1808, where he assisted his father in the care of a farm. The country was at that time a wilderness, and the adventures of young Stone during his early pioneer life formed material that he afterward wrought into border tales.

At the age of seventeen, he became a printer in the office of the Cooperstown Federalist, and in 1813 he was editor of the Herkimer American, with Thurlow Weed as his journeyman. Subsequently, he edited the Northern Whig at Hudson, New York, and in 1817 the Albany Daily Advertiser. In 1818 he succeeded Theodore Dwight in the editorship of the Hartford Mirror. While at Hartford, Jonathan Mayhew Wainwright (afterward bishop), Samuel G. Goodrich (Peter Parley), Isaac Toucey, and himself alternated in editing a literary magazine called The Knights of the Round Table. At Hudson, he also edited The Lounger, a literary periodical which was noted for its pleasantry and wit.

In 1821 he succeeded Zachariah Lewis as editor of the New York Commercial Advertiser, becoming at the same time one of its proprietors, which place he held for the rest of his life. As such, he was a defendant in a famous suit brought by the novelist James Fenimore Cooper for criticisms that had appeared in the Commercial Advertiser on that novelist's Home as Found and the History of the Navy.

Stone always advocated the abolition of slavery by congressional action in the columns of the Commercial Advertiser, as well as the activities of the American Colonization Society. He served as President of the New York Colonization Society. At the anti-slavery convention at Baltimore in 1825, he originated and drew up the plan for slave emancipation, including the deportation of all freed slaves out of the United States and financial compensation to slaveholders, which was recommended at that time to Congress for adoption. He was one of the leading public critics of the American Anti-Slavery Society and others in favor of "immediate emancipation" and has been called one of the principal fomenters of the Anti-abolitionist riots (1834).

In 1824, his sympathies were strongly enlisted in behalf of the Greeks in their struggles for independence, and, with Edward Everett and Samuel G. Howe, was among the first to draw the attention of the country to that people and awaken sympathy in their behalf. In 1825, with Thurlow Weed, he accompanied the Marquis de Lafayette on a trip up the Hudson River on the steam boat James Kent during Lafayette's tour through the United States. Brown University gave him the degree of A.M. in 1825.

Soon after the disappearance of William Morgan and the subsequent controversy around Freemasonry, Stone, who was a Freemason, addressed a series of letters on "Masonry and Anti-Masonry" to John Quincy Adams, who in his retirement at Quincy had taken interest in the anti-Masonic movement. In these letters, which were afterward collected and published (New York, 1832), the author maintained that Masonry should be abandoned, chiefly because it had lost its usefulness.

Although the influence of Colonel Stone (as he was familiarly called as he held that rank on Governor De Witt Clinton's staff) extended throughout the country, it was felt most particularly in New York City. He was the first superintendent of public schools in New York City, and while holding the office, in 1844, had a discussion with Archbishop John Hughes in relation to the use of the Bible in the public schools. He was active in religious enterprises and furthering benevolent associations for the deaf and dumb and for juvenile delinquents.

In 1838 he originated and introduced a resolution in the New York Historical Society directing a memorial to be addressed to the New York legislature praying for the appointment of an historical mission to the governments of England and the Netherlands for the recovery of such papers and documents as were essential to a correct understanding of the colonial history of the state. This was the origin of the collection known as the New York Colonial Documents made by John Romeyn Brodhead, who was sent abroad for that purpose by Governor William H. Seward in the spring of 1841. He also, as one biographer put it, "cleared away the mists of slander that had gathered around the name of De Witt Clinton, and by preserving strict impartiality he secured that credence which no ex parte argument could obtain, however ingenious."

In 1841 he was appointed by President William Henry Harrison minister to the Hague, but was later recalled by President John Tyler.

Colonel Stone was appointed a chief of the Seneca Nation of Indians. He also gave lectures at Union College in Schenectady, New York on "the evils of the use of tobacco." He was noted for investigating the claims of Maria Monk.

He was burlesqued by Laughton Osborn in The Vision of Rubeta, a satire in the classical style. Osborn had been displeased by a critical review by Stone of an earlier work of his.

Family
Stone was married to Susannah Wayland, sister of the President of Brown University, Doctor Francis Wayland. 
Their only son, William Leete Stone Jr., was also a historical writer on the times of the American Revolution.

Works
 History of the Great Albany Constitutional Convention of 1821 (Albany, 1822)
 Narrative of the Grand Erie Canal Celebration, prepared at the request of the New York Common Council (New York, 1825)
 Letters on Masonry and Anti-Masonry addressed to Hon. John Quincy Adams (New York, 1832) 
 Tales and Sketches: Such As They Are (2 vols., New York, 1834) Volume 1 Volume 2
 Matthias and His Impostures (New York, 1833)
 The Mysterious Bridal and Other Tales (3 vols., New York, 1835)
 Maria Monk and the Nunnery of the Hotel Dieu, which put an end to an extraordinary mania (New York, 1836)
 Ups and Downs in the Life of a Distressed Gentleman, a satire on the fashionable follies of the day (New York/Boston, 1836)
 The Witches: A Tale of New-England (Bath, NY, 1837); republished as Mercy Disborough: A Tale of New England Witchcraft (Bath, NY, 1844)
 Letter to Doctor A. Brigham, on Animal Magnetism (New York, 1837)
 Life of Joseph Brant-Thayendanegea (2 vols., New York, 1838) 
 Life and Times of Red-Jacket, or Sa-go-ye-wat-ha (New York, 1841; new ed., with memoir of the author by his son William L. Stone, 1866)
 The Poetry and History of Wyoming, including Thomas Campbell's "Gertrude" (New York & London, 1841)
 Uncas and Miantonomoh (New York, 1842)
 Border Wars of the American Revolution (2 vols., 1843) Volume 1 Volume 2

See also
 Robert Matthews (religious figure), known as Matthias the Prophet

References

 
 

1792 births
1844 deaths
19th-century American historians
American newspaper editors
American male journalists
Brown University alumni
People from New Paltz, New York
American abolitionists
People from Sodus, New York
People from Cooperstown, New York
Burials at Greenridge Cemetery
19th-century American male writers
Activists from New York (state)
Historians from New York (state)
Historians of New York (state)